Wendy Marie Fuller (born January 8, 1965 in Montreal, Quebec) is a retired diver from Canada, who represented her native country at the 1988 Summer Olympics, finishing in 13th place in the Women's 10m Platform. In the same event she won a silver medal at the 1987 Pan American Games in Indianapolis, United States. Her younger sister Debbie also competed as an international diver.

References

External links
 
 

1965 births
Living people
Canadian female divers
Olympic divers of Canada
Divers at the 1988 Summer Olympics
Pan American Games silver medalists for Canada
Pan American Games medalists in diving
Divers at the 1987 Pan American Games
Florida State University alumni
Anglophone Quebec people
Divers from Montreal
Medalists at the 1987 Pan American Games
20th-century Canadian women